Valentine French, a graduate of Trinity College, Dublin and Prebendary of Cork, was an eighteenth century Irish Anglican priest: he was Dean of Ross, Ireland  from 1717 until 1739.

References

Alumni of Trinity College Dublin
Deans of Ross, Ireland
18th-century Irish Anglican priests
Year of birth missing
Year of death missing